Eriomastyx is a genus of moths in the family Erebidae. The genus was erected by Rothschild and Jordan in 1905.

Species
 Eriomastyx griseobasis (Rothschild, 1913)
 Eriomastyx lacteata Rothschild, 1916
 Eriomastyx latus Rothschild & Jordan, 1905

References

External links

Nudariina
Moth genera